The Taiwan Pineapple Museum is a museum of pineapple in Dashu District, Kaohsiung, Taiwan.

History
The museum is housed in a refurbished factory constructed in 1925 called Jioucyutang Taifang Company, a factory that canned pineapples produced by farms around the region. In 2004, the factory building was listed as a historical monument by the Kaohsiung County Government. The building was then renovated and reopened as Taiwan Pineapple Museum in August 2018.

Exhibitions
The museum exhibits the history of the Jioucyutang Taifang Company and Dashu District. It also displays an overview of the agriculture activities in the region, especially of the pineapple industry. It has a collection of more than 50 canned pineapple labels produced by the company.

Transportation
The museum is accessible within walking distance north of Jiuqutang Station of Taiwan Railways.

See also
 List of museums in Taiwan
 Pineapple production in Taiwan

References

External links
 

2018 establishments in Taiwan
Agriculture in Taiwan
Industrial buildings completed in 1925
Museums established in 2018
Museums in Kaohsiung